Thomas Temple Ellard (born 1962) is an Australian electronic musician best known as the founding member of the electronic and industrial music group Severed Heads.

Early life
Ellard's first music contributions began in the late 1970s as a teenager when he was influenced by groups that emerged from the early United Kingdom and Australian punk movement.

Predating music technology such as MIDI and personal computers, Ellard's early work was performed with tape machines, tape loops and basic analogue equipment. In 1979, Richard Fielding and Andrew Wright formed an electronic dance group called Mr. and Mrs. No Smoking Sign, and they were soon joined by Ellard.

Career
Fielding renamed the group Severed Heads. Through the 1980s, Ellard began to take advantage of technological developments such as the music sequencer in combination with looping sounds before sampling arose. Severed Heads were probably most well known in Australia for chart success with a 1994 remix of the track "Dead Eyes Opened" (initially released in the early 1980s), which made the Australian top 40. Ellard is also noted for his early contributions to the electronic and industrial music movements in Australia and overseas.

In 2013, Ellard created the interactive game Hauntology House. He has expressed interest in the computer-gaming platform many times in interviews.

Awards
In 2005, Ellard received the Australian Record Industry Association's ARIA Music Award for the best original soundtrack/cast/show for the soundtrack to the Australian film The Illustrated Family Doctor.

Personal life
, Ellard resides in Surry Hills, New South Wales and continues to record music and soundtracks. He also lectures at a variety of educational facilities on music production in Australia. He is the creator and director of sevcom.com, a website for alternative methods of music distribution and creation.

Discography

Solo albums
Snappy Carrion (1982)
80's Cheesecake (1982)
Return To Barbara Island (2010)
Meteosat 2004 (2013)
Barbara Channel 3 (2014)
Rhine (2015)

With Severed Heads

Side 2 (1980)
Clean (1981)
Blubberknife (1982)
Since The Accident (1983)
City Slab Horror (1985)
Come Visit The Big Bigot (1986)
Bad Mood Guy (1987)
Rotund For Success (1989)
Cuisine (With Piscatorial) (1991)
Gigapus (1994)
Haul Ass (1998)
Under Gail Succubus (2006)

With CoKlaComa
Coklapop (1996)
Maximus (1999)
It's All Good! (2000)

References

1962 births
Living people
Australian electronic musicians
Musicians from Sydney
Severed Heads members